Banu or BANU may refer to:

 Banu (name)
 Banu (Arabic), Arabic word for "the sons of" or "children of"
 Banu (makeup artist), an Indian makeup artist
 Banu Chichek, a character in the Book of Dede Korkut
 Bulgarian Agrarian National Union, a political party

Places
 Banu, Iran (disambiguation), various places in Iran 
 Bannu or Banū City, in Khyber-Pakhtunkhwa, Pakistan
 Banu, a village in the commune of Dumești, Iași, Romania
 Banú, a village in County Wexford, Ireland

See also

Bangu (disambiguation)
Banhu, Chinese musical instrument
Bannu (disambiguation)
Banou, Burkina Faso
Bhanu (disambiguation)
Bianhu
Bonu (disambiguation)